Amur Bay (Amurskiy Zaliv), a major bay within Peter the Great Gulf of the Sea of Japan, has an approximate length of , a width of  to , and a depth of . It is part of a larger bay formed with Ussuri Bay, to which it is connected by the Eastern Bosphorus, and from which it is separated by the Muravyov-Amursky Peninsula and by the Eugénie Archipelago. The Amba River, Razdolnaya River, Narva River, and Barabashevka River all flow into Amur Bay.

Administratively, Amur Bay is entirely within Primorsky Krai, Russia. Vladivostok, the largest city in the Russian Far East and the capital of Primorsky Krai, is situated along the eastern coast of the bay on the Muravyov-Amursky Peninsula and the Eugénie Archipelago. Amur Bay is a popular tourism and recreation area in Primorsky Krai, with many sanatoriums, beach resorts and children's summer camps.

References

Bays of Primorsky Krai
Pacific Coast of Russia